Great River is a 2010 documentary film from director Matt LeMay and McIntyre Media. Great River won the 2011 Award of Excellence in Film making at the 2011 Canada International Film Festival.

About the film
The film is about the treatment of First Nations people post Indian Act by the Canadian Government. The film also covers the defacing of indigenous rock art. A team of rock experts investigate the vandalism.

It was distributed by First Nations Films and McIntyre Media.

Awards
 Canada International Film Festival 2011 Award of Excellence in Film making
 2011 Write Brothers Screenplay Competition Winner, Documentary Competition.
 Social Media Marketing Award

References

External links
Great River video, McIntyre Media Inc. website.

Interview with director LeMay about Great River, CBC, March 15, 2011

2010 films
English-language Canadian films
2010 documentary films
Canadian documentary films
Documentary films about First Nations
Assimilation of indigenous peoples of North America
2010s English-language films
2010s Canadian films
English-language documentary films